The 4 × 100 metre mixed freestyle relay competition at the 2017 World Championships was held on 29 July 2017.

Records
Prior to the competition, the existing world and championship records were as follows.

The following new records were set during this competition

Results

Heats
The heats were held at 10:21.

Final
The final was held at 19:17.

References

4 x 100 metre mixed freestyle relay
World